Zagor may refer to:

People
 Bernadett Zágor (born 1990), Hungarian football player
 Józef Zagor (born 1940), Polish equestrian

Places
 Zagor (Trnovo), Bosnia and Herzegovina
 Zagor or 
 Nowy Zagór, Poland
 Stary Zagór, Poland
 Zagăr, Romania

Other
 Zagor (comics)
 Zagor (festival)
 Zagor (film), a 1970 Turkish film
 Zagor (music)
 In the Fighting Fantasy franchise
 Legend of Zagor, a role-playing gamebook
 A character in the adventure gamebook The Warlock of Firetop Mountain

See also
 Zagora (disambiguation)
 Zagori (disambiguation)